Océan was a 118-gun first-rate three-decker ship of the line of the French Navy, lead ship of her class. She was funded by a don des vaisseaux donation from the Estates of Bourgogne.

She was ordered as États de Bourgogne and was launched at Brest in 1790. Like many French ships of the line during the Revolutionary period, she was renamed several times, becoming Côte d'Or in January 1793, Montagne in October 1793, Peuple on 17 May 1795, and a matter of weeks later again renamed, to Océan. She served until 1855.

A large model of a generic Océan-class ship, named Océan, at the  scale can be seen at the Musée de la Marine in Paris.

Career 

As the largest ship of the line in the Brest fleet, the ship spent much of her early career as the fleet flagship.

As Montagne, the ship was the flagship of Rear-Admiral Villaret-Joyeuse in the Combat de Prairial (known in English literature as the Glorious First of June) in 1794.

On 17 May 1795, she was renamed Peuple; a month later, on 23 June she fought in the Battle of Groix as Villaret's flagship. Returning to Lorient three days later, she was officially renamed to Océan, a name that had been in use since 30 May.

She was refitted in Brest in 1797.

In 1801, she once again served as Villaret's flagship, ferrying troops of Leclerc's expedition to Saint-Domingue.

Océan was Allemand's flagship at the Battle of the Basque Roads.

She was decommissioned on 2 August 1850, and used as a floating artillery battery from May 1851.

Notes and References

Notes

References

Bibliography 
 "Le vaisseau trois-ponts l’Océan", Jean Boudriot, in Neptunia n° 102 (1971), page 21.
 
  (1671-1870)

External links
 French ship Océan 

Ships of the line of the French Navy
Océan-class ships of the line
1790 ships
Don des vaisseaux
Ships built in France